Nine Days in One Year is a 1962 Soviet black-and-white drama film directed by Mikhail Romm about nuclear particle physics, physicists and their relationships. The film is based on true events. It is one of the most important Soviet films of the 1960s. It won the Crystal Globe Award in 1962.

Plot summary
Two young physicists and old friends — the possessed experimental physicist Dmitri Gusev and the skeptical theoretical physicist Ilya Kulikov — conduct nuclear studies at a research institute in Siberia. Dmitri leads the research started by his teacher Sintsov, who has received a deadly dose of radiation as a result of an experiment. Dmitri has also been irradiated. Doctors warn him that further irradiation might kill him as well. Meanwhile, his friend Ilya and Lyolya, a love interest of Dmitri, have developed a romantic relationship. The enamoured couple is getting prepared for the wedding and looking for an opportunity to inform Dmitri. When they finally meet, Dmitri already suspects Lyolya and Ilya and treats them coldly. Caught up in self-contradictions, Lyolya tries to understand Dmitri's true feelings for her, only to learn the terrible diagnosis. Realizing that she still loves Dmitri, Lyolya cancels the wedding to Ilya in order to marry Dmitri.

Despite the health warnings, Dmitri continues with his experiments in fusion power. After a number of failures, he turns to Ilya for help. Whilst carrying out of the experiment successfully, Dmitri receives a new radiation dose. He tries to hide this fact from everyone, including his wife Lyolya who is misinterpreting his sudden isolation, though the truth eventually rises to the surface. The research work has been continued by Ilya. Dmitri's health is getting worse, but he decides to fight his illness to the end and agrees to undergo bone marrow transplantation.

Production
The film's working title was 365 Days. Mikhail Romm assembled a team of people with whom he had never previously worked before.

Popular actors Yury Yakovlev and Alexey Batalov were hired for the main roles. Before the filming started, Yakovlev was hospitalized and had to be replaced with Innokenty Smoktunovsky. For the main female part a young and little-known actress Tatyana Lavrova of the Sovremennik Theatre was invited. The role of Lyolya was Tatiana’s best known role in her film career, later she mainly devoted herself to the theater.

The screenplay was written by Romm jointly with Khrabrovitsky. The cinematographer of the film was a newcomer German Lavrov. In many respects, the picture became a new word in the Soviet cinema. Experts have noted an unusual interpretation of the theme song and sound engineering - in fact there is almost no music, there is only a certain sound accompaniment of the technological sense. The sets of the film were also innovative.

The filming took 6 months. The premiere was on 5 March 1962 at the Rossiya Theatre in Moscow.

7 actors participated in the film who were later awarded the title of People's Artist of the USSR: Batalov (1976), Smoktunovsky (1974), Plotnikov (1966), Blinnikov (1963), Gerdt (1990), Evstigneev (1983), Durov (1990). The director Mikhail Romm became the People's Artist of the USSR in 1950.

Alexey Batalov witnessed that numerous dark parts which were conceived by the authors were removed from the film per censorship requirements. As a result, an episode was removed where Gusev visits his mother's grave, a possible indication that in the finale the disease leads to Gusev becoming blind.

Reception

Cast
 Aleksey Batalov as Dmitri Gusev, nuclear physicist
 Innokenty Smoktunovsky as Ilya Kulikov, nuclear physicist
 Tatyana Lavrova as Lyolya
 Nikolai Plotnikov as professor Sintsov
 Sergei Blinnikov as Paul D. Butov, director of the Institute
 Yevgeniy Yevstigneyev as Nikolai Ivanovich, physicist
 Mikhail Kozakov as Valery Ivanovich, physicist
 Valentin Nikulin as young physicist
 Pavel Shpringfeld as physicist
 Aleksandr Pelevin as physicist
 Yevgeni Teterin as professor Pokrovsky (surgeon)
 Nikolai Sergeyev as Gusev's Father
 Ada Vojtsik as Maria Tikhonovna, Sintsov's wife 
 Valentina Belyayeva as doctor
 Igor Yasulovich as Fedorov, physicist
 Lyusyena Ovchinnikova as Nura, Gusev's younger sister

Off-screen voice by Zinovi Gerdt (narrator).

References

External links

 Nine Days in One Year at Turner Classic Movies

1962 films
Soviet black-and-white films
1962 drama films
Films directed by Mikhail Romm
Mosfilm films
1960s Russian-language films
Crystal Globe winners
Films about scientists